The following are the national records in athletics in Turkey maintained by Turkey's national athletics federation: Türkiye Atletizm Federasyonu (TAF).

Outdoor

Key to tables:

+ = en route to a longer distance

h = hand timing

A = affected by altitude

w = windy conditions

NWI = no wind information

X = annulled by doping violation

Men

Women

Mixed

Indoor

Men

Women

Notes

References
General
Turkish Outdoor Records  – Men  10 September 2022 updated
Turkish Outdoor Records  – Women  4 February 2023 updated
Turkish Indoor Records  – Men  10 February 2023 updated
Turkish Indoor Records  – Women  4 February 2023 updated
Specific

External links
 TAF web site 

Turkey
Records
Athletics records
Athletics